The 2003–04 Phoenix Coyotes season was their eighth season in the National Hockey League, the franchise's 25th season in the NHL and 32nd overall. For the second year in a row, the Coyotes failed to make the playoffs. It would be the first season the franchise would have playing their home games at the Glendale Arena. However, because the Glendale Arena didn't open until December 26, the first 13 home games were played at America West Arena. The Coyotes went 5–14–5–4 for 19 points in their new home stadium.

Off-season
Defenseman and team captain Teppo Numminen was traded to the Dallas Stars on July 22. Forward Shane Doan was named his replacement on the eve of training camp.

Regular season
Though the Coyotes finished last in their division (13th in the Conference), for a remarkable span in late December and early January, the team attracted the attention of the sports world, as goaltender Brian Boucher set an NHL record for consecutive shutouts. From December 31 to January 9, Boucher and the Coyotes recorded five consecutive shut-out victories, outscoring their opponents 18–0 during the span. The streak was broken on January 11 in a game against the visiting Atlanta Thrashers, when Randy Robitaille scored on Boucher at 6:16 of the first period. Boucher's streak lasted 332:01, surpassing Montreal Canadiens goaltender Bill Durnan's 1949 record by over 20 minutes.

The Coyotes struggled after the streak, winning only six of their remaining 40 games. A winless streak of 15 games from February 21 to March 21 is the third longest in franchise history and the longest since the franchise moved to Arizona in 1996. Head coach Bob Francis was fired on February 24 and replaced by assistant coach Rick Bowness, who served as interim head coach for the remainder of the season and throughout the 2004–05 NHL lockout.

Final standings

Schedule and results

|- align=center bgcolor="#CCFFCC"
|1||W||October 10, 2003||2–1 OT||align=left|St. Louis Blues (2003–04)||1–0–0–0 || 
|- align=center bgcolor="#CCFFCC"
|2||W||October 12, 2003||2–0||align=left|@ Mighty Ducks of Anaheim (2003–04)||2–0–0–0 || 
|- align=center bgcolor="#CCFFCC"
|3||W||October 15, 2003||2–1||align=left|@ Florida Panthers (2003–04)||3–0–0–0 || 
|- align="center" bgcolor="#FFBBBB"
|4||L||October 16, 2003||1–5||align=left|@ Tampa Bay Lightning (2003–04)||3–1–0–0 || 
|- align=center bgcolor="#FFBBBB"
|5||L||October 18, 2003||4–5||align=left|Philadelphia Flyers (2003–04)||3–2–0–0 || 
|- align=center bgcolor="#FFBBBB"
|6||L||October 23, 2003||4–5||align=left|Toronto Maple Leafs (2003–04)||3–3–0–0 || 
|- align=center
|7||T||October 25, 2003||4–4 OT||align=left|@ San Jose Sharks (2003–04)||3–3–1–0 || 
|- align=center
|8||T||October 26, 2003||3–3 OT||align=left|@ Vancouver Canucks (2003–04)||3–3–2–0 || 
|- align=center
|9||T||October 28, 2003||2–2 OT||align=left|Chicago Blackhawks (2003–04)||3–3–3–0 || 
|- align=center bgcolor="#FFBBBB"
|10||L||October 31, 2003||1–4||align=left|Vancouver Canucks (2003–04)||3–4–3–0 || 
|-

|- align=center bgcolor="#FFBBBB"
|11||L||November 1, 2003||3–7||align=left|@ Los Angeles Kings (2003–04)||3–5–3–0 || 
|- align=center bgcolor="#FFBBBB"
|12||L||November 6, 2003||1–2||align=left|@ Colorado Avalanche (2003–04)||3–6–3–0 || 
|- align=center bgcolor="#CCFFCC"
|13||W||November 8, 2003||4–3 OT||align=left|Mighty Ducks of Anaheim (2003–04) ||4–6–3–0 || 
|- align=center bgcolor="#FF6F6F"
|14||OTL||November 9, 2003||1–2 OT||align=left|@ Mighty Ducks of Anaheim (2003–04) ||4–6–3–1 || 
|- align=center bgcolor="#CCFFCC"
|15||W||November 13, 2003||3–2 OT||align=left|Colorado Avalanche (2003–04)||5–6–3–1 || 
|- align=center
|16||T||November 14, 2003||3–3 OT||align=left|@ Dallas Stars (2003–04)||5–6–4–1 || 
|- align=center
|17||T||November 16, 2003||2–2 OT||align=left|@ Columbus Blue Jackets (2003–04)||5–6–5–1 || 
|- align=center bgcolor="#CCFFCC"
|18||W||November 19, 2003||5–4||align=left|St. Louis Blues (2003–04)||6–6–5–1 || 
|- align=center bgcolor="#FFBBBB"
|19||L||November 21, 2003||0–5||align=left|San Jose Sharks (2003–04)||6–7–5–1 || 
|- align=center bgcolor="#FFBBBB"
|20||L||November 23, 2003||0–1||align=left|@ Atlanta Thrashers (2003–04)||6–8–5–1 || 
|- align=center bgcolor="#FFBBBB"
|21||L||November 24, 2003||2–5||align=left|@ Dallas Stars (2003–04)||6–9–5–1 || 
|- align=center bgcolor="#CCFFCC"
|22||W||November 27, 2003||6–4||align=left|Los Angeles Kings (2003–04)||7–9–5–1 || 
|- align=center
|23||T||November 30, 2003||3–3 OT||align=left|@ Boston Bruins (2003–04)||7–9–6–1 || 
|-

|- align=center bgcolor="#CCFFCC"
|24||W||December 2, 2003||3–1||align=left|@ New Jersey Devils (2003–04)||8–9–6–1 || 
|- align=center bgcolor="#CCFFCC"
|25||W||December 4, 2003||3–2||align=left|@ Buffalo Sabres (2003–04)||9–9–6–1 || 
|- align=center bgcolor="#FFBBBB"
|26||L||December 5, 2003||2–3||align=left|@ Philadelphia Flyers (2003–04)||9–10–6–1 || 
|- align=center
|27||T||December 7, 2003||2–2 OT||align=left|@ Chicago Blackhawks (2003–04)||9–10–7–1 || 
|- align="center" bgcolor="#CCFFCC"
|28||W||December 10, 2003||2–1||align=left|Dallas Stars (2003–04)||10–10–7–1 || 
|- align=center
|29||T||December 12, 2003||3–3 OT||align=left|Edmonton Oilers (2003–04)||10–10–8–1 || 
|- align=center bgcolor="#FFBBBB"
|30||L||December 15, 2003||2–5||align=left|Minnesota Wild (2003–04)||10–11–8–1 || 
|- align=center
|31||T||December 18, 2003||4–4 OT||align=left|@ Los Angeles Kings (2003–04)||10–11–9–1 || 
|- align=center
|32||T||December 20, 2003||1–1 OT||align=left|@ St. Louis Blues (2003–04)||10–11–10–1 || 
|- align=center
|33||T||December 22, 2003||3–3 OT||align=left|@ Nashville Predators (2003–04)||10–11–11–1 || 
|- align=center bgcolor="#CCFFCC"
|34||W||December 23, 2003||2–1||align=left|@ Columbus Blue Jackets (2003–04)||11–11–11–1 || 
|- align=center bgcolor="#FFBBBB"
|35||L||December 27, 2003||1–3||align=left|Nashville Predators (2003–04)||11–12–11–1 || 
|- align=center bgcolor="#FF6F6F"
|36||OTL||December 29, 2003||2–3 OT||align=left|New York Rangers (2003–04)||11–12–11–2 || 
|- align=center bgcolor="#CCFFCC"
|37||W||December 31, 2003||4–0||align=left|Los Angeles Kings (2003–04)||12–12–11–2 || 
|-

|- align=center bgcolor="#CCFFCC"
|38||W||January 2, 2004||6–0||align=left|@ Dallas Stars (2003–04)||13–12–11–2 || 
|- align=center bgcolor="#CCFFCC"
|39||W||January 4, 2004||3–0||align=left|@ Carolina Hurricanes (2003–04)||14–12–11–2 || 
|- align=center bgcolor="#CCFFCC"
|40||W||January 7, 2004||3–0||align=left|@ Washington Capitals (2003–04)||15–12–11–2 || 
|- align=center bgcolor="#CCFFCC"
|41||W||January 9, 2004||2–0||align=left|@ Minnesota Wild (2003–04)||16–12–11–2 || 
|- align=center
|42||T||January 11, 2004||1–1 OT||align=left|Atlanta Thrashers (2003–04)||16–12–12–2 || 
|- align=center bgcolor="#FFBBBB"
|43||L||January 13, 2004||1–4||align=left|Vancouver Canucks (2003–04)||16–13–12–2 || 
|- align=center bgcolor="#FFBBBB"
|44||L||January 15, 2004||3–4||align=left|@ Nashville Predators (2003–04)||16–14–12–2 || 
|- align=center
|45||T||January 16, 2004||3–3 OT||align=left|@ Detroit Red Wings (2003–04)||16–14–13–2 || 
|- align=center bgcolor="#FFBBBB"
|46||L||January 21, 2004||2–4||align=left|San Jose Sharks (2003–04)||16–15–13–2 || 
|- align=center bgcolor="#CCFFCC"
|47||W||January 22, 2004||2–1||align=left|@ San Jose Sharks (2003–04)||17–15–13–2 || 
|- align=center bgcolor="#CCFFCC"
|48||W||January 24, 2004||5–2||align=left|Detroit Red Wings (2003–04)||18–15–13–2 || 
|- align=center bgcolor="#FFBBBB"
|49||L||January 27, 2004||1–2||align=left|Calgary Flames (2003–04)||18–16–13–2 || 
|- align=center bgcolor="#FFBBBB"
|50||L||January 29, 2004||1–4||align=left|Ottawa Senators (2003–04)||18–17–13–2 || 
|- align=center bgcolor="#FFBBBB"
|51||L||January 31, 2004||4–5||align=left|Dallas Stars (2003–04)||18–18–13–2 || 
|-

|- align=center
|52||T||February 2, 2004||3–3 OT||align=left|Columbus Blue Jackets (2003–04)||18–18–14–2 || 
|- align=center bgcolor="#FF6F6F"
|53||OTL||February 4, 2004||4–5 OT||align=left|Florida Panthers (2003–04)||18–18–14–3 || 
|- align=center bgcolor="#FFBBBB"
|54||L||February 5, 2004||0–5||align=left|@ San Jose Sharks (2003–04)||18–19–14–3 || 
|- align=center bgcolor="#FFBBBB"
|55||L||February 11, 2004||3–5||align=left|@ Mighty Ducks of Anaheim (2003–04)||18–20–14–3 || 
|- align=center bgcolor="#FFBBBB"
|56||L||February 13, 2004||2–5||align=left|New York Islanders (2003–04)||18–21–14–3 || 
|- align=center bgcolor="#CCFFCC"
|57||W||February 14, 2004||3–2||align=left|Dallas Stars (2003–04)||19–21–14–3 || 
|- align=center bgcolor="#FFBBBB"
|58||L||February 16, 2004||2–4||align=left|@ St. Louis Blues (2003–04)||19–22–14–3 || 
|- align=center bgcolor="#FFBBBB"
|59||L||February 18, 2004||2–5||align=left|@ Detroit Red Wings (2003–04)||19–23–14–3 || 
|- align="center" bgcolor="#CCFFCC"
|60||W||February 20, 2004||3–2||align=left|Columbus Blue Jackets (2003–04)||20–23–14–3 || 
|- align=center bgcolor="#FFBBBB"
|61||L||February 21, 2004||2–8||align=left|Nashville Predators (2003–04)||20–24–14–3 || 
|- align=center
|62||T||February 23, 2004||1–1 OT||align=left|Mighty Ducks of Anaheim (2003–04)||20–24–15–3 || 
|- align=center bgcolor="#FF6F6F"
|63||OTL||February 25, 2004||3–4 OT||align=left|Pittsburgh Penguins (2003–04)||20–24–15–4 || 
|- align=center bgcolor="#FFBBBB"
|64||L||February 27, 2004||2–7||align=left|Edmonton Oilers (2003–04)||20–25–15–4 || 
|- align=center bgcolor="#FFBBBB"
|65||L||February 29, 2004||2–4||align=left|@ Calgary Flames (2003–04)||20–26–15–4 || 
|-

|- align=center bgcolor="#FF6F6F"
|66||OTL||March 2, 2004||4–5 OT||align=left|@ Edmonton Oilers (2003–04)||20–26–15–5 || 
|- align=center bgcolor="#FFBBBB"
|67||L||March 5, 2004||3–4||align=left|Montreal Canadiens (2003–04)||20–27–15–5 || 
|- align="center"
|68||T||March 7, 2004||1–1 OT||align=left|Minnesota Wild (2003–04)||20–27–16–5 || 
|- align=center bgcolor="#FFBBBB"
|69||L||March 9, 2004||2–3||align=left|@ Los Angeles Kings (2003–04)||20–28–16–5 || 
|- align=center bgcolor="#FFBBBB"
|70||L||March 10, 2004||1–3||align=left|Los Angeles Kings (2003–04)||20–29–16–5 || 
|- align=center bgcolor="#FFBBBB"
|71||L||March 12, 2004||2–3||align=left|Colorado Avalanche (2003–04)||20–30–16–5 || 
|- align=center bgcolor="#FFBBBB"
|72||L||March 14, 2004||1–4||align=left|@ Colorado Avalanche (2003–04)||20–31–16–5 || 
|- align=center bgcolor="#FF6F6F"
|73||OTL||March 16, 2004||2–3 OT||align=left|Mighty Ducks of Anaheim (2003–04)||20–31–16–6 || 
|- align=center
|74||T||March 18, 2004||1–1 OT||align=left|Detroit Red Wings (2003–04)||20–31–17–6 || 
|- align=center
|75||T||March 21, 2004||2–2 OT||align=left|@ Chicago Blackhawks (2003–04)||20–31–18–6 || 
|- align=center bgcolor="#CCFFCC"
|76||W||March 22, 2004||3–2 OT||align=left|@ Minnesota Wild (2003–04)||21–31–18–6 || 
|- align=center bgcolor="#FFBBBB"
|77||L||March 24, 2004||0–4||align=left|Calgary Flames (2003–04)||21–32–18–6 || 
|- align=center bgcolor="#FFBBBB"
|78||L||March 26, 2004||0–3||align=left|San Jose Sharks (2003–04)||21–33–18–6 || 
|- align=center bgcolor="#FFBBBB"
|79||L||March 28, 2004||2–4||align=left|@ Edmonton Oilers (2003–04)||21–34–18–6 || 
|- align=center bgcolor="#FFBBBB"
|80||L||March 29, 2004||1–6||align=left|@ Vancouver Canucks (2003–04)||21–35–18–6 || 
|- align=center bgcolor="#FFBBBB"
|81||L||March 31, 2004||0–1||align=left|@ Calgary Flames (2003–04)||21–36–18–6 || 
|-

|- align="center" bgcolor="#CCFFCC"
|82||W||April 3, 2004||2–1 OT||align=left|Chicago Blackhawks (2003–04)||22–36–18–6 || 
|-

|-
| Legend:

Player statistics

Scoring
 Position abbreviations: C = Center; D = Defense; G = Goaltender; LW = Left Wing; RW = Right Wing
  = Joined team via a transaction (e.g., trade, waivers, signing) during the season. Stats reflect time with the Coyotes only.
  = Left team via a transaction (e.g., trade, waivers, release) during the season. Stats reflect time with the Coyotes only.

Goaltending
  = Joined team via a transaction (e.g., trade, waivers, signing) during the season. Stats reflect time with the Coyotes only.
  = Left team via a transaction (e.g., trade, waivers, release) during the season. Stats reflect time with the Coyotes only.

Awards and records

Awards

Records
Brian Boucher set two modern day (since the 1943–44 season when the center ice red line was introduced) NHL records. From December 22, 2003, to January 11, 2004, Boucher went 332 minutes and 1 second without allowing a goal. From December 31, 2003, to January 9, 2004, Boucher recorded five shutouts in a row, which also set the modern day record for consecutive shutouts by a team.

Transactions
The Coyotes were involved in the following transactions from June 10, 2003, the day after the deciding game of the 2003 Stanley Cup Finals, through June 7, 2004, the day of the deciding game of the 2004 Stanley Cup Finals.

Trades

Players acquired

Players lost

Signings

Draft picks
Phoenix's draft picks at the 2003 NHL Entry Draft held at the Gaylord Entertainment Center in Nashville, Tennessee.

See also
 2003–04 NHL season

Notes

References

 
 

Pho
Pho
Arizona Coyotes seasons